Jacqueline Ann Gemelos (Greek: Τζάκι Γέμελου; born November 22, 1988) is an American-Greek former professional basketball player and coach.

Early life and college career
Born and raised in Stockton, California, Jacqueline Ann Gemelos graduated from St. Mary's High School in 2006.

Gemelos was widely regarded as the most recruited player in her high school class, but she suffered five knee injuries during her high school and college career. At USC, Gemelos missed the 2006–07 through 2008–09 seasons due to injuries, before making her collegiate debut on February 4, 2010, at Cal and had eight points, five rebounds, and five assists. She ended the 2009–10 season averaging 7.6 points and 3.6 rebounds.

Gemelos completed her bachelor's degree in sociology at USC in 2010 and master's degree in gerontology in 2012. She played all 37 games (28 starts) of the 2010–11 season and averaged 12.4 points and 4.6 rebounds. In the 2011–12 season, Gemelos started the first nine games before a season-ending injury on December 18, 2011. That season, she averaged 11.0 points and 7.3 rebounds.

Southern California statistics

Source

Professional career

WNBA
In the 2012 WNBA draft, the Minnesota Lynx drafted Gemelos in the third round. Gemelos was signed to the team in April 2013 but was released prior to the regular season.

In 2015, Gemelos made her WNBA debut with the Chicago Sky. In 17 games with Chicago, Gemelos averaged 1.1 points, 0.5 rebounds, and 0.4 assists.

On April 11, 2018, Gemelos signed a contract to return to the United States to play in the WNBA with the Las Vegas Aces, but was eventually cut from the final roster.

On June 25, 2020, Gemelos signed a contract to play in the WNBA with the Connecticut Sun. Despite enduring five ACL tears and eight knee surgeries over the last 15 years of her career, Gemelos finally debuted for the Sun on July 28, 2020; five years after her first stint with the Sky. She scored 6 points and 1 rebound in the game.

Euroleague
Gemelos debuted professionally with  Panathinaikos of the Greek Women's Basketball League in the 2013–14 season. She averaged 17.6 points and 6.2 rebounds in 15 games.

In 2014–15, Gemelos played for PF Umbertide of the Italian Serie A1, averaging 14.2 points and 5.8 rebounds.

She returned to Europe for the 2015–16 season with Perfumerias Avenida of the Spanish Liga Femenina de Baloncesto, who went 25–1 for the season. In 25 games, Gemelos averaged 10.2 points and 4.8 rebounds.

On May 23, 2016, Gemelos again signed with a Serie A1 team in Italy, Saces Mapei Napoli.

USA Basketball
Gemelos played on the team presenting the US at the 2011 World University Games held in Shenzhen, China. The team won all six games to earn the gold medal. Gemelos was tied for third for assists on the team, with 11 over the course of the tournament. Gemelos averaged 4.8 points per game.

Greek National team
On 28 January 2018 Gemelos was selected to the Greece women's national basketball team.

Personal life
Her father Steve Gemelos, of Greek descent, played college basketball at Weber State and San Joaquin Delta, followed by two years of professional basketball in Greece. In 2012, Jacki Gemelos became a dual citizen of the US and Greece.
Gemelos owns a line of apparel called "Overcome."

References

External links
WNBA player page
Basketball-reference profile of Gemelos
USC Trojans bio 
Overcome, apparel line owned by Gemelos

1988 births
Living people
Greek women's basketball players
American women's basketball players
American people of Greek descent
American expatriate basketball people in Italy
American expatriate basketball people in Spain
Basketball players from Stockton, California
Chicago Sky players
Connecticut Sun players
LGBT basketball players
Minnesota Lynx draft picks
New York Liberty coaches
Olympiacos Women's Basketball players
Panathinaikos WBC players
Point guards
Universiade gold medalists for the United States
Universiade medalists in basketball
USC Trojans women's basketball players
Washington Mystics players
United States women's national basketball team players